is a railway station located in the town of Fukaura, Aomori Prefecture, Japan, operated by the East Japan Railway Company (JR East).

Lines

Station layout
Ōdose  Station has one ground-level side platform serving a single bi-directional track. The station was built with dual opposed side platforms, but only the former southbound platform is now used. The station is unattended and is managed from Goshogawara Station. There is no station building.

History
Ōdose Station was opened on November 5, 1933 as a station on the Japan National Railways (JNR). It has been unattended since March 19, 1984. With the privatization of the JNR on April 1, 1987, it came under the operational control of JR East. The station has been unattended since May 1, 2002.

Surrounding area

See also
 List of Railway Stations in Japan

References

External links

   

Stations of East Japan Railway Company
Railway stations in Aomori Prefecture
Gonō Line
Fukaura, Aomori
Railway stations in Japan opened in 1933